The Antigua and Barbuda Defence Force (ABDF) is the armed forces of Antigua and Barbuda. The ABDF has responsibility for several different roles: internal security, prevention of drug smuggling, the protection and support of fishing rights, prevention of marine pollution, search and rescue, ceremonial duties, assistance to government programs, provision of relief during natural disasters, assistance in the maintenance of essential services, and support of the police in maintaining law and order.

The ABDF is one of the world's smallest militaries, consisting of 245 personnel. It is much better equipped for fulfilling its civil roles, as opposed to providing a deterrence against would-be aggressors or in defending the nation during a war.

Organisation

The ABDF consists of five major units:
Antigua and Barbuda Regiment – comprises four line companies and is the infantry unit and fighting arm of the defence force.
Service and Support Unit – provides administrative, logistic and engineer support to the rest of the defence force.
Coast Guard – the maritime element of the defence force, and is divided into four units:
Commanding Officer's Office
Engineer Unit
Administration Unit
Flotilla – the flotilla is the operational part of the Coast Guard, and consists of the following water-craft:
1 Swiftships Shipbuilders 19.81-metre Commercial Cruiser-class patrol boat (P-01 Liberta), in service since 1984
1 SeaArk Boats Dauntless-class patrol boat (P-02 Palmetto), in service since 1995
1 Point-class cutter (P-03 Hermitage), transferred from the U.S. Coast Guard in 1998
1 Defender 380X-class all-weather interceptor (D-8), date of acquisition unknown
2 Boston Whaler 8.23-metre launches (071 and 072), in service since 1988
1 Zodiac Marine & Pool 8.23-metre Hurricane-type rigid-hulled inflatable boat in service since 1998
Antigua and Barbuda Air Wing
Antigua and Barbuda Cadet Corps

Former deployments
 In 1983, fourteen men of the Antigua and Barbuda Defence Force were deployed to Grenada during the Operation Urgent Fury.
 In 1990, twelve soldiers were sent to Trinidad and Tobago after a failed coup attempt by a radical group against the constitutionally elected government headed by Prime Minister A.N.R. Robinson.
 In 1995, members of the Antigua and Barbuda Defence Force were deployed in Haiti as a part of Operation Uphold Democracy.

Alliances
 – Mercian Regiment

See also 
 Regional Security System

References

External links
 Antigua and Barbuda Defence Force official page
Article on the ABDF by Dr Dion Phillips

 
Military units and formations established in 1981